Below are the player squads of the teams participating in the 2009 CONCACAF Gold Cup. All rosters consist of 23 players (with 3 goalkeepers), except for the United States, which was given 7 extra roster slots due to recent participation in the 2009 FIFA Confederations Cup.

The statistics in the tables below represent player profiles as of the beginning of the tournament.  See individual player articles for current statistics.

Group A

Canada
Head coach:  Stephen Hart

Costa Rica
Head coach:  Rodrigo Kenton

El Salvador
Head coach:  Carlos de los Cobos

Jamaica
Head coach:  Theodore Whitmore

Group B

Grenada
Head coach:  Tommy Taylor

Haiti
Head coach:  Jairo Ríos

Honduras
Head coach:  Reynaldo Rueda

United States
Head coach:  Bob Bradley

Group C

Guadeloupe
Head coach:  Roger Salnot

Mexico
Head coach:  Javier Aguirre

Nicaragua
Head coach:  Ramón Otoniel Olivas

Panama
Head coach:  Gary Stempel

References

CONCACAF Gold Cup squads
Squads